Krygier is a surname. Notable people with the surname include:

Richard Krygier (1917–1986), Polish-born Australian anti-communist publisher and journalist
Todd Krygier (born 1965), American ice hockey player
Włodzimierz Krygier (1900–1975), Polish ice hockey and football player 
Benjamin Krygier (born 1974), American businessman, custom home builder, police officer, motorcycle racer and private airplane pilot